Bel-Aire, Bel Aire or Belaire may refer to:

Places
Bel-Aire, Calgary, a neighbourhood in Calgary, Alberta, Canada
Bel Aire, Kansas, United States
Bel Aire, Tiburon, California, United States
Bel Aire (Charlottesville, Virginia), United States

Other uses
Belair Mansion (disambiguation)
Belaire Apartments, a New York City apartment complex
Belaire High School, a high school in Baton Rouge, Louisiana, United States
Belaire Rosé, a French sparkling wine

See also
Bel Air (disambiguation)
Belair (disambiguation)
Bellair (disambiguation)
Bellaire (disambiguation)
Bellairs, a surname
Belleair (disambiguation)